Mashhadi (also Romanized as Mashhadī; also known as Boneh-ye Khanjar, Khanjar, and Masḩadī) is a village in Shahid Modarres Rural District, in the Central District of Shushtar County, Khuzestan Province, Iran. At the 2006 census, its population was 61, in 13 families.

References 

Populated places in Shushtar County